Peter Gaehtgens (born 1 September 1937 in Dresden) is a German professor of physiology. In 1999, he became president of Free University of Berlin after winning the associated elections against Gesine Schwan. He stayed in this position until 2003, when he was elected president of the German "Rector's Conference" (Hochschulrektorenkonferenz). Gaethgens was a leading proponent of the country-wide introduction of tuition fees at German universities. For this reason, he was heavily criticized in public.

Cake-smashing incident 

On 2 November 2005, during the last year of his tenure, this criticism culminated in an attack by four protesting students who smashed two cakes in his face amid a plenary session at the University of Tübingen.

References

Living people
1937 births
Academic staff of the Free University of Berlin